My Hero is a British television sitcom, created by Paul Mendelson, and produced for the BBC between 2000 and 2006. The series follows the exploits of an alien superhero known as "Thermoman" - a multi-powered superhero who originates from the planet Ultron - during his time between missions after falling in love with a British nurse he rescued. Although incredibly intelligent amongst his kind, Thermoman is unfamiliar with human life, which not only leads others to consider him dim-witted and idiotic, but also causes problems due to his many misunderstandings.

The main role of Thermoman was portrayed by Ardal O'Hanlon up until 2005, before he was replaced by James Dreyfus for the final series. The cast itself remained largely unchanged throughout its broadcast history, and included Emily Joyce, Lill Roughley, Tim Wylton, Lou Hirsch, Hugh Dennis, Geraldine McNulty, and Philip Whitchurch. Unlike most British sitcoms, Mendelson co-wrote episode scripts with a large team of writers. Each series also featured a varying number of episodes, with the first and second series containing six episodes, series three through five containing 10 episodes each and series six containing 8 episodes, with a Christmas Special for 2000.

Despite its viewing figures going into decline by the time of Dreyfus' appearance, the show remained a regular feature on British television, being regularly repeated on Gold in the United Kingdom. In the United States, the series was shown on PBS and, briefly, BBC America. In Australia, UKTV offered re-runs of the first three series, while BBC Entertainment provided repeats for Scandinavia. Three of the six series have been released on DVD; two on Region 1 DVD and one on Region 2. Fans have since petitioned the BBC to release the complete series on DVD.

Premise
The series focuses on the life of George Sunday, a man who comes off as idiotic, but who in reality is a superhero from the planet Ultron known as "Thermoman", who serves to safeguard humanity and the Earth, and Janet Dawkins, a British nurse who works at a local surgery in the London town of Northolt, whom George falls in love with after saving her life. The series focuses on the couple's efforts to cope with numerous problems that occur to them during their relationship, including dealing with Janet's obnoxius parents and the self-centered doctor whom she works for, and George's many misunderstandings of human culture, societial values and traits.

After the second series, the writers added in additional elements surrounding the couple being married and having children of Ultronian origin - capable of speech, intelligence and super powers for their infant age - and coping with issues surrounding their family lives. In the sixth series, George loses his old body, and replaces it with a new one that he gives the alias of George Monday, taking up work as a doctor alongside Piers at his surgery.

Cast

 Ardal O'Hanlon as George Sunday AKA "Thermoman" (Series 1–5) - A dim-witted superhero, intelligent on alien matters, but completely unable to understand human society and values.
 James Dreyfus as George Monday AKA "Thermoman" (Series 6) - George's new alias after losing his old one due to financial troubles, who shows some intelligence but is still misunderstanding of human culture.
 Emily Joyce as Janet Dawkins - A British nurse and George's lover, who often struggles with the alien aspects of his life and people.
 Lill Roughley as Ella Dawkins - Janet's obnoxious mother.
 Tim Wylton as Stanley Dawkins - Janet's mildly obnoxious father.
 Lou Hirsch as Arnie Kowalski - George's cousin, and a former superhero who was stripped of his powers for abusing them. Initially written to living in the USA, the third series saw writers relocate him to Northolt and developing a relationship with Mrs. Raven.
 Hugh Dennis as Dr. Piers Crispin - A self-centered, pompous TV doctor who runs his own surgery in Northolt and regularly looks for ways to increase his fame and popularity.
 Geraldine McNulty as Mrs. Raven - Pier's surgery receptionist, who is a vindictive, sadistic woman with a cruel liking for basking in other people's misery.
 Philip Whitchurch as Tyler - George and Janet's next-door neighbour, who suffers delusions and hallucinations that cause him to mix up fictional elements, most from science-fiction, fantasy and conspiracy theories, with real-life. He is the only one to know of George's real identity. After the first series, the writers gave him more prominence, including being George's assistant at his shop.
 Moya Brady as Avril (Series 1) - George's assistant in his shop. The character was written out after the first series.
 Pat Kelman as the Ultron Postie (Series 3–6) - Ultronian postman who delivers correspondence to George on Earth
 Finlay Stroud as Apollo "Ollie" Sunday (Series 2-6) - George and Janet's son. Highly intelligent in human life, compared to his father, with his superpowers. 
 Madeline Mortimer as Cassandra "Cassie" Sunday (series 5-6) - George and Janet's daughter, highly intelligent, possessing the power of premonition and foresight.

Episodes

Home media
In the United States, the series has been released on DVD via BBC Video; "Season One" was released on 16 January 2007, while "Season Two" was released on 7 August 2007. The sets are now currently out-of-print and no subsequent seasons have been made available on region 1.

In the United Kingdom, Series Three was the only series to receive a home video release. The "Complete Series 3" was released on VHS on 7 October 2002 via IMC Vision, while two DVD sets, "Volume 1" (episodes 1–5 of Series 3), and "Volume 2" (episodes 6–10 of Series 3) were also released on 7 October 2002. A DVD set containing "Complete Series 3" was additionally made available from IMC Vision on 14 May 2012.

As of 2021, it has not been announced if My Hero will receive any subsequent series releases, or a complete series box set.

Series one and two of My Hero became available to stream in the UK via BritBox from 10 March 2022.

See also
 Mork & Mindy

References

External links
 
 

2000 British television series debuts
2006 British television series endings
2000s British comic science fiction television series
2000s British sitcoms
BBC science fiction television shows
BBC television sitcoms
British superhero television series
British fantasy television series
English-language television shows
Extraterrestrial superheroes
Northolt
Superhero comedy television series
Television series about extraterrestrial life
Television series about families
Television series about marriage
Television shows set in London
Television series by Little Brother Productions
Television shows shot at Teddington Studios